In enzymology, a geraniol dehydrogenase is an enzyme that catalyzes the chemical reaction

geraniol + NADP+  geranial + NADPH + H+

Thus, the two substrates of this enzyme are geraniol and NADP+, whereas its 3 products are geranial, NADPH, and H+.

This enzyme belongs to the family of oxidoreductases, specifically those acting on the CH-OH group of donor with NAD+ or NADP+ as acceptor. The systematic name of this enzyme class is geraniol:NADP+ oxidoreductase.

References

 

EC 1.1.1
NADPH-dependent enzymes
Enzymes of unknown structure